VH1 Storytellers is the 83rd overall album and is a live album by Johnny Cash and Willie Nelson, released in 1998 (see 1998 in music) on American Recordings. The album was produced by Rick Rubin and was the third record released as part of Cash's ten-year period of collaboration with Rubin. It is not, however, counted as part of the American Recordings series, which is reserved for Cash's studio work with Rubin.

Cash and Nelson take turns on songs associated with each respective artist, usually with the other performing harmony or occasionally verses. The opening track is a duet with Cash and Nelson, and some tracks feature guitar solos by Nelson. Between tracks, Cash and Nelson joke with each other and discuss the songs and their origins.

This was the final album of new performances released by Cash prior to the onset of health problems that forced him to curtail live concerts, and which also led to changes in the timbre of his voice noticeable from American III: Solitary Man (his next album release of new recordings issued in 2000) onwards. It was also Cash's final purpose-recorded live album to be released during his lifetime, though an archival recording, Johnny Cash at Madison Square Garden, recorded in 1969, would be issued a year before his death.

Track listing

Personnel

 Johnny Cash - Vocals, Guitar, Producer
 Willie Nelson - Vocals, Guitar

Additional personnel

 Rick Rubin - Producer, Mixing
 Sean Murphy - Producer
 Bill Flanagan - Executive Producer
 Michael Simon - Director
 Koji Egawa - Assistant Engineer, Mixing Assistant
 Randy Ezratty, Al Schmitt - Mixing
 Paul Cohen - House Mix
 Stephen Marcussen - Mastering
 David Coleman - Art Direction, Artwork, Design
 Wayne Wilkins - Art Direction, Artwork
 Marc Bryan-Brown - Photography
 Bruce Gillmer - Project Supervisor
 Wayne Isaak - Music Executive
 Sean Kelly - Coordination

Charts
Album - Billboard (United States)

Albums produced by Rick Rubin
1998 live albums
Collaborative albums
Willie Nelson live albums
Johnny Cash live albums
American Recordings (record label) live albums
VH1 Storytellers